Lovely Professional University (LPU) is a private university located in Chaheru, Phagwara, Punjab, India. The university was established in 2005 by Lovely International Trust, under The Lovely Professional University Act, 2005 (Punjab Act 25 of 2005) and started operation in 2006.

Campus
The university campus is spread over 600 acres in Chaheru Village on the Jalandhar-Delhi GT Road.It is approx 7 km away from Phagwara and approx 12 km away from Jalandhar.

Governance
The university is governed by chancellor Ashok Kumar Mittal. The administration and operations are governed by pro-chancellor of the institution Rashmi Mittal. Preeti Bajaj is the vice-chancellor of the university.

Affiliations
LPU is affiliated with the University Grants Commission, the National Council for Teacher Education and the Council of Architecture and approved by the Pharmacy Council of India. It is also a member of the Association of Indian Universities (AIU). The law programs are recognized by the Bar Council of India

LPU's School of Agriculture is accredited by the Indian Council of Agricultural Research (ICAR).

Internationally, LPU is accredited by the Accreditation Council for Business Schools and Programs (ACBSP) and a member of the Association of Commonwealth Universities (ACU).

The distance education programmes are approved by the Distance Education Bureau (DEB).

Schools
LPU has the following schools:

Rankings

Times Higher Education World University Rankings 2022 ranked LPU in 1001–1200th. In India, the National Institutional Ranking Framework ranked Lovely Professional University 81st overall, and 62nd among universities. It also ranked it 37th in management, 23rd in pharmacy, 66th in engineering, 24th in law and 12th in architecture ranking in India.

Notes

References

External links

 

Lovely Professional University
Universities in Punjab, India
Education in Jalandhar
Educational institutions established in 2005
2005 establishments in Punjab, India
Private universities in India